Ellipsis is a remix album by Scorn, originally released in 1995 on Earache Records. It was remastered along with Evanescence and released as a two disc set in 2009.

It's mainly a remix album for Evanescence, though it contains a remix of Nights Ash Black from Colossus. The remixes were made by Meat Beat Manifesto, Coil, Bill Laswell, Scanner, Autechre, P.C.M. and Germ, as well as Scorn themselves.

Track listing
 "Silver Rain Fell (Meat Beat Manifesto Mix)" – 8:35
 "Exodus (Scorn Mix)" – 5:39
 "Dreamspace (Shadow Vs Executioner Mix)" – 11:30
 "Night Ash Black (Slow Black Underground River Mix)" – 15:47
 "Night Tide (Flaneur Electronique Mix)" – 6:30
 "Falling (FR 13 Mix)" – 10:18
 "The End (Nightmare Mix)" – 7:40
 "Automata (Germ Mix)" – 6:52
 "Light Trap (Scorn Mix)" – 6:08

Personnel
Nic Bullen – bass, sampler, percussion, voice, guitar
Mick Harris – drums, drum programming, sampler, percussion,

References

Music in Birmingham, West Midlands
Scorn (band) albums
1995 remix albums
Earache Records remix albums